This is a list of winners and nominees of the Primetime Emmy Award for Outstanding Picture Editing for a Limited or Anthology Series or Movie.

In the following list, the first titles listed in gold are the winners; those not in gold are nominees, which are listed in alphabetical order. The years given are those in which the ceremonies took place:

Winners and nominations

1970s

1980s

1990s

2000s

2010s

2020s

Editors with multiple awards

4 awards
 John A. Martinelli 

3 awards
 Michael Brown
 Eric A. Sears

2 awards
 Paul LaMastra
 Jerrold L. Ludwig
 Peter Zinner

Editors with multiple nominations

9 nominations
 John A. Martinelli 

6 nominations
 Paul LaMastra
 Jerrold L. Ludwig 

5 nominations
 James Galloway 

4 nominations
 Michael Brown 
 Robert Florio
 Les Green
 Bud S. Isaacs 
 Skip Macdonald
 Rita Roland
 Eric A. Sears
 Robert F. Shugrue
 Peter Zinner

3 nominations
 John Bloom
 Fred A. Chulack
 C. Chi-Yoon Chung
 Paul Dixon
 Henk Van Eeghen 
 Michael Eliot
 Alan Heim
 Michael D. Ornstein
 Geoffrey Rowland
 William B. Stich
 Scott Vickrey
 Benjamin A. Weissman 

2 nominations
 Véronique Barbe
 David Beatty
 Henry Berman 
 Bill Blunden
 Fabienne Bouville
 Scott Boyd
 Richard Bracken 
 Byron 'Buzz' Brandt
 John F. Burnett
 Steven Cohen
 Alan Cody
 Peter Coulson 
 Amy E. Duddleston 
 David Eisenberg
 Ronald J. Fagan 
 Gene Fowler
 Mel Friedman
 Antony Gibbs
 Anna Hauger 
 Bryan M. Horne 
 Nona Khodai 
 Regis Kimble
 Jason Krasucki

 Justin Lachance
 Maxime Lahaie
 Robert K. Lambert 
 Sylvain Lebel
 Michael S. McLean 
 Millie Moore
 George Nicholson 
 Melanie Oliver 
 Adam Penn
 Lee Percy
 Charlie Phillips
 Donald R. Rode 
 Paul Rubell
 Curtis Thurber
 Leo Trombetta 
 Barbara Tulliver
 Edward Warschilka
 Robert Watts
 Jon Woodcock
 John Wright
 Jerry Young

Programs with multiple nominations

8 nominations
 Fargo

6 nominations
 American Crime Story

3 nominations
 The Pacific
 Sherlock
 Watchmen

2 nominations
 American Horror Story
 Band of Brothers
 Chernobyl
 Dopesick
 Elizabeth I
 From the Earth to the Moon
 Generation Kill
 Mare of Easttown
 The Thorn Birds
 WandaVision
 The White Lotus

References

Picture Editing for a Limited or Anthology Series or Movie